Sebastian Wotschke (born ) is a German male track cyclist, representing Germany at international competitions. He competed at the 2016 UEC European Track Championships in the elimination race event and team pursuit event.

References

1992 births
Living people
German male cyclists
German track cyclists
Place of birth missing (living people)
Cyclists from Berlin